This is a partial list of notable people associated with the General Theological Seminary in New York City.

Faculty and Staff
 J. Neil Alexander (born 1954), professor of homiletics and liturgics; IX Bishop of Atlanta
 Reginald R. Belknap (1871–1959), treasurer, bursar, and registrar
 Peter Carnley (born 1937), primate of Australia, visiting professor of systematic theology
 F. J. Foakes-Jackson (1855–1941), church historian
 Frank S. B. Gavin, ecumenist and historian
 Benjamin I. Haight, professor of pastoral theology
 Francis J. Hall (1857–1932), professor of dogmatic theology
 Francis L. Hawks (1798–1866), church historian
 John Henry Hobart (1775–1830), bishop of New York, founder, dean, pastoral theologian
 Eugene Augustus Hoffman (1829–1902), dean, benefactor
 Leonard Hodgson (1889–1969), theologian, church historian
 David Hurd (born 1950), organist, composer
 Alan Jones (born 1940), professor of ascetical theology
 Frederick Joseph Kinsman (1868–1944), church historian
 Lloyd A. Lewis (born 1947), adjunct professor of New Testament
 Clement Clarke Moore (1779–1863), biblical scholar, donor of land for the seminary, author of "A Visit from St. Nicholas"
 Benjamin T. Onderdonk (1791–1861), professor of nature, ministry and polity of the church, bishop of New York
 Pierson Parker (1905–1995), New Testament scholar
 W. Norman Pittenger (1905–1997), theologian
 Cornelius L. Reid (1911–2008), voice teacher
 Thomas Richey (1831-1905), alumnus and professor of church history
 Charles Roper (1858–1940), theologian, metropolitan of Ontario 
 Alexander Schmemann (1921–1983), adjunct professor of liturgy
 Samuel Seabury (1801–1872), biblical scholar
 Niels Henry Sonne (1907–1944), rare books librarian and curator
 Eugene Sutton (born 1954), adjunct professor of homiletics
 Samuel H. Turner (1790–1861), Hebrew scholar
 Gulian C. Verplanck (1786–1870), professor of evidences of revealed religion and moral science, attorney, U.S. representative
 Julian Wachner (born 1969), professor of music
 Philip Waggett (1862–1939), British Anglo-Catholic priest
 Somerset Walpole (1854–1929), theologian, bishop of Edinburgh
 J. Robert Wright (1936-2022), church historian

Alumni
 James M. Adams, Jr. (born 1948), bishop of Western Kansas
 J. Neil Alexander (born 1954), bishop of Atlanta
 Kevin Bond Allen (born 1954), bishop of Cascadia
 William Edmond Armitage (1830–1873), bishop of Wisconsin
 David Ball (born 1926), bishop of Albany
 Ellen Barrett (born 1946), Episcopal priest
 Frederick L. Barry (1897–1960), bishop of Albany
 Frederick H. Belden (1909-1979), Tenth bishop of the Episcopal Diocese of Rhode Island.
 Alan P. Bell (1932-2002), Kinsey Institute researcher
 David Bird (born 1946), Rector, St. Andrew's Church, New Kensington, Pa., Grace Church, Georgetown, Washington, D.C., and Dean, Trinity Episcopal Cathedral (San Jose, California)
 Richard Nelson Bolles (born 1927), priest, self-help author
 Frederick Borsch (born 1935), bishop of Los Angeles  
 William Hampton Brady (1912–1996), bishop of Fond du Lac
 Kenneth A. Bray (1895–1953), Episcopal priest, teacher, and coach
 James Lloyd Breck (1818–1876), founder of Nashotah House
 Benjamin Brewster (1860–1941), bishop of Western Colorado
 James Brown (born 1932), bishop of Louisiana
 John Henry Hobart Brown (1831–1888), first bishop of Fond du Lac
 Alexander Burgess (1819-1901), first Bishop of Quincy
 Spence Burton (1881–1966), bishop suffragan of Haiti, bishop of Nassau
 Clement Moore Butler (1810–1890), Episcopal priest and Chaplain of the Senate
 Arthur Carey (1822–1844), Episcopal priest
 Thomas Casady (1881–1958), bishop of Oklahoma
 Frank S. Cerveny (born 1933), bishop of Florida
 Albert Chambers (1906–1993), bishop of Springfield 
 E. Otis Charles (born 1926), bishop of Utah
 Leighton Coleman (1837–1907), bishop of Delaware
 Arthur Cleveland Coxe (1818–1896), bishop of Western New York 
 Roland de Corneille (born 1927), Canadian priest, member of Parliament
 Marvin Dana (1867–1926), author and magazine editor
 James DeKoven (1831–1879), Episcopal priest and educator
 Morgan Dix (1827–1908), Episcopal priest, theologian, author
 Robert Duncan, (born 1948), bishop of Pittsburgh; archbishop and primate of the Anglican Church in North America
 Manton Eastburn (1801–1872), bishop of Massachusetts
 Christopher Epting (born 1946), bishop of Iowa
 John H. Esquirol (1900–1972), bishop of Connecticut
 William Leopold Essex (1886–1959), bishop of Quincy
 Thomas F. Gailor (1856–1935), bishop of Tennessee
 Frederick R. Graves (1858–1940), missionary bishop of Shanghai
 Campbell Gray (1879–1944) bishop of Northern Indiana 
 Frank T. Griswold (born 1937), bishop of Chicago, 25th presiding bishop of the Episcopal Church
 Francis Joseph Hall (1857–1933), theologian
 Alexander Hamilton (1847–1928), Episcopal priest
 Daniel W. Hardy (1930–2007), theologian
 Joseph M. Harte, (1914-1999) bishop of Arizona
 William Hatch (1875–1972), New Testament scholar
 Marion J. Hatchett (1927–2009), liturgical scholar
 Matthew Heyd, Episcopal priest
 Edward Young Higbee (1810–1871), Episcopal priest and Chaplain of the Senate
 Eugene Augustus Hoffman (1829–1902), Episcopal priest and benefactor
 John Henry Hopkins, Jr. (1820–1891), Episcopal priest, author of We Three Kings
 George Hendric Houghton (1820–1897), Episcopal priest
 Jack Iker (born 1949), bishop of Fort Worth
 Ignatius Zakka I Iwas (born 1933), patriarch of Antioch, Syriac Orthodox Church
 Stephen H. Jecko (1940–2007), bishop of Florida 
 James L. Jelinek (born 1942), bishop of Minnesota
 Arthur Whipple Jenks (1863–1922), theologian
 Jim Kelsey (1952–2007), bishop of Northern Michigan
 William Ingraham Kip (1811–1893), first bishop of California
 David Buel Knickerbacker (1833–1894), bishop of Indiana
 Cyrus F. Knight (1831–1891), bishop of Milwaukee
 Alfred Lee (1807–1887), bishop of Delaware, 10th presiding bishop of the Episcopal Church
 Fritz Leiber (1910–1992), fantasy writer
 Abiel Leonard (1848-1903), bishop of the Episcopal Diocese of Utah with Nevada Territory
 Arthur C. Lichtenberger (1900–1968), bishop of Missouri, 21st presiding bishop
 Harry S. Longley (1868–1944), bishop of Iowa
 Theodore B. Lyman (1815–1893), bishop of North Carolina
 Reginald Mallett (1893–1965), bishop of Northern Indiana
 C. Shannon Mallory (born 1936), bishop of Botswana, bishop of El Camino Real
 Santosh Marray (born 1957), bishop of Seychelles
 Baselios Mar Thoma Mathews II (1915–2006), 89th Catholicos of the East
 Jim McGreevey (born 1957), governor of New Jersey
 James McMaster (1820–1886), Roman Catholic newspaper editor
 Eric Menees, bishop of San Joaquin
 Steven Andrew Miller (born 1957), bishop of Milwaukee
 William Millsaps (born 1939), presiding bishop, Episcopal Missionary Church
 Leonel Mitchell (1930–2012), liturgical scholar
 Paul Moore, Jr. (1919–2003), bishop of New York
 Frank Morales (born 1949), Episcopal priest and activist
 Benjamin Wistar Morris (1819–1906), bishop of Oregon
 Theodore N. Morrison (1850–1929), bishop of Iowa
 Arthur Moulton (1873–1962), bishop of Utah
 Marc Nikkel (1950–2000), priest, missionary to the Dinka
 Frederick B. Northup (born 1945), priest, former Dean of St. Mark’s Cathedral, Seattle
 William Odenheimer (1817–1879) bishop of New Jersey 
 G. Ashton Oldham (1877–1963), bishop of Albany
 Hugh R. Page (b. 1956), Episcopal priest and scholar at Notre Dame University
 Austin Pardue (1899–1981), bishop of Pittsburgh
 Leighton Parks (1852–1938), Episcopal priest
 Henry N. Parsley, Jr. (born 1948), bishop of Alabama
 Samuel Penny (1808–1853), Episcopal priest
 ZeBarney Thorne Phillips (1875–1942), Episcopal priest and Chaplain of the Senate
 Norman Pittenger (1905–1997), theologian
 Jeannette Piccard (1895–1981), high altitude balloonist, priest (one of the Philadelphia Eleven)
 Alberto Ramento (1936–2006), ninth supreme bishop of the Philippine Independent Church
 George Maxwell Randall (1810–1873), missionary bishop of Colorado
 Ann Holmes Redding (born 1951), priest, convert to Islam
 Francisco Reus-Froylan (1919–2008), bishop of Puerto Rico
 Gene Robinson (born 1947), bishop of New Hampshire
 Nelson Somerville Rulison (1842–1897), bishop of Central Pennsylvania
 Frank Runyeon (born 1953), stage and screen actor
 Robert C. Rusack (1926–1986), bishop of Los Angeles
 Francis Huger Rutledge (1799–1866), bishop of Florida
 Henry Y. Satterlee (1843–1908), bishop of Washington
 John Scarborough (1831–1913), bishop of New Jersey
 Alan Scarfe (born 1950), bishop of Iowa
 Joseph Schereschewsky (1831–1906), missionary bishop of Shanghai
 John-David Schofield (1938–2013), bishop of San Joaquin
 Lorenzo Sears (1838–1916), historian and biographer
 M. Thomas Shaw, SSJE (born 1945), bishop of Massachusetts
 Herbert Shipman (1869–1930), bishop suffragan of New York
 Sam Shoemaker (1893–1963), founder, Faith at Work
 Frederick Herbert Sill (1874–1952), founder, headmaster of Kent School
 Mark Sisk (born 1942), bishop of New York
 Richard P. Smiraglia (born 1952), librarian and information scientist
 Gordon V. Smith (1906–1997), bishop of Iowa
 Franklin Spencer Spalding (1865–1914), missionary bishop of Utah
 John Franklin Spalding (1828–1902), bishop of Colorado
 Robert R. Spears, Jr. (1918–2008), bishop of Rochester
 William L. Stevens (1932–1997), bishop of Fond du Lac
 Barry Swain (born 1959), Episcopal priest
 Ethelbert Talbot (1848–1928), bishop of Bethlehem, 15th presiding bishop of the Episcopal Church
 Frederick W. Taylor (1853–1903), bishop of Quincy
 Robert Terwilliger (1917–1991), bishop suffragan of Dallas
 Andrew Yu-Yue Tsu (朱友渔, 1885–1986) assistant bishop of Hong Kong, general secretary of the Chung Hua Sheng Kung Hui, "Bishop of the Burma Road"
 Daniel S. Tuttle (1837–1923), bishop of Missouri, 13th presiding bishop of the Episcopal Church
 Ralph Ernest Urban, (1875–1935) suffragan bishop of New Jersey
 Thomas Hubbard Vail (1821–1889), bishop of Kansas
George Roe Van De Water, major proponent of the compatibility of Freemasonry with Christianity
 Vedder Van Dyck (1889–1960), bishop of Vermont
 Kenneth Abbott Viall (1893–1974), provincial superior, SSJE, assistant bishop of Tokyo
 Orris George Walker, (1942-2015), seventh bishop of the Episcopal Diocese of Long Island
 Clarence A. Walworth (1820–1900), Roman Catholic priest and writer
 Edward Nason West (1909–1990), sub-dean, Cathedral of St. John the Divine
 Ozi William Whitaker (1830–1911), bishop of Pennsylvania
 Henry John Whitehouse (1803–1874), bishop of Illinois
 William Rollinson Whittingham (1805–1879), bishop of Maryland 
 Frederick B. Williams (1939–2008), priest, social activist
 John Williams (1817–1899), bishop of Connecticut, 11th presiding bishop of the Episcopal Church
 Frank E. Wilson (1885–1944), bishop of Eau Claire

References

Episcopal Church (United States)